The 2018–19 Iran Super League season was the 29th season of the Iranian basketball league.

Shahrdari Tabriz was the defending champion, but the club withdrew before the start of the season.

Regular season

Standings

Results

Playoffs

 Petrochimi Bandar Imam and Chemidor Tehran decided to share the third place and cancel the third place series.

Quarterfinals
The higher-seeded team played the second and third leg (if necessary) at home.

|}

Semifinals
The higher-seeded team played the first, second and fifth leg (if necessary) at home.

|}

Final
The higher-seeded team played the first, second and fifth leg (if necessary) at home.

|}

References
 Asia Basket
 Iranian Basketball Federation

Iranian Basketball Super League seasons
Iran